Beings Contemporary Peruvian Short Stories is an anthology that collects eight short stories of Peruvian neorealistic literature from 1960 to 2014. It was edited and introduced in 2014 by Elisa Cairati of the University of Milan and translated into English by Anna Heath. The anthology contains the following stories:

 Julio Ramón Ribeyro, Alienation
 Luis Loayza, Cold Afternoons
 Fernando Ampuero, Bad Manners
 Jorge Eduardo Benavides, It Doesn't Have to Be This Way
 Guillermo Niño de Guzmán, No More Than A Shadow
 Alonso Cueto, The Love Artist 
 Gunter Silva Passuni, Homesick
 Ricardo Sumalavia, The Offering

César Ferreira describes the anthology as "a welcome and timely contribution that makes available some of the best short fiction to come out of Peru in recent decades".

References 

 José Manuel Morales, 2015, “Beings Contemporary Peruvian Short Stories”. Ventana Latina 
 Juan Toledo, 2015, “Beings Contemporary Peruvian Short Stories: El amor y otras obsesiones nacionales”. Perro Negro

Bibliography 
BEINGS: Contemporary Peruvian Short Stories (anthology), London, Berforts Press, 2014. 

2014 anthologies
Fiction anthologies
Peruvian literature